The 1981 Italian Indoor Open, also known as the Bologna Open or Bologna Indoor, was a men's tennis tournament played on indoor carpet courts that was part of the 1981 Volvo Grand Prix circuit and took place in Bologna, Italy. It was the seventh and last edition of the tournament and was held from 16 November through 22 November 1981. Third-seeded Sandy Mayer won the singles title.

Finals

Singles
 Sandy Mayer defeated  Ilie Năstase 7–5, 6–3
 It was Mayer's only singles title of the year and the 9th of his career.

Doubles
 Sammy Giammalva Jr. /  Henri Leconte defeated  Tomáš Šmíd /  Balázs Taróczy 7–6, 6–4

References

External links
 ATP tournament profile
 ITF tournament edition details

Italian Indoor Open
Italian Indoor Open
Italian Indoor Open
November 1981 sports events in Europe